Æthelberht (died 797) was an 8th-century Anglo-Saxon bishop. His consecration as Bishop of Whithorn can be placed using the Anglo-Saxon Chronicle on 15 June in either 776 or 777, and took place at York. In 789, 790 or 791 he became Bishop of Hexham; he was succeeded at Whithorn by Beadwulf. He died on 16 October 797. He is known to have corresponded with Alcuin.

Citations

References
 Anderson, Alan Orr (ed.), Scottish Annals from English Chroniclers: AD 500–1286, (London, 1908), republished, Marjorie Anderson (ed.) (Stamford, 1991)
 Bateson, Mary, "Pehtwine  (d. 776/7)", rev. Marios Costambeys, Oxford Dictionary of National Biography, Oxford University Press, 2004 accessed 1 Oct 2007

External links
 

797 deaths
Anglo-Saxon bishops of Whithorn
Bishops of Hexham
8th-century English bishops
Year of birth unknown